Richard Leonard Habbin (born 6 January 1949 in Cambridge, England) is an English former footballer and manager.

Career
Habbin joined Reading in March 1969 from non-league side Cambridge United. He joined Rotherham United in January 1975 after making 219 appearances and scoring 24 goals in the Football League for Reading. He made 84 appearances and scored 19 goals in the league for them before joining Doncaster Rovers in September 1977. He made 60 appearances and scored 12 goals in the league for them before being released at the end of the 1978–79 season.

He became player-manager of Maltby Miners Welfare in 1979.

Notes

1949 births
Living people
Sportspeople from Cambridge
English footballers
Association football forwards
Cambridge United F.C. players
Reading F.C. players
Rotherham United F.C. players
Doncaster Rovers F.C. players
Maltby Main F.C. players
English football managers
Maltby Main F.C. managers